Alpha-L-arabinofuranosidase (arabinosidase, alpha-arabinosidase, alpha-L-arabinosidase, alpha-arabinofuranosidase, polysaccharide alpha-L-arabinofuranosidase, alpha-L-arabinofuranoside hydrolase, L-arabinosidase, alpha-L-arabinanase) is an enzyme with systematic name alpha-L-arabinofuranoside arabinofuranohydrolase. This enzyme catalyses the following chemical reaction

 Hydrolysis of terminal non-reducing alpha-L-arabinofuranoside residues in alpha-L-arabinosides

The enzyme acts on alpha-L-arabinofuranosides, alpha-L-arabinans containing (1,3)- and/or (1,5)-linkages, arabinoxylans and arabinogalactans.

References

External links 
 

EC 3.2.1